Caenorhabditis imperialis is a species of nematodes in the genus Caenorhabditis. Prior to 2014, it was referred to as C. sp. 14. The type isolate was collected in Mo'orea, French Polynesia, and other isolates were collected in Guadeloupe.

This species groups with C. afra in the 'Japonica' group, the sister clade to the 'Elegans' group, in the 'Elegans' supergroup.

References

External links 

imperialis
Fauna of French Polynesia
Fauna of Guadeloupe
Nematodes described in 2014